The 7th Screen Actors Guild Awards, honoring the best achievements in film and television performances for the year 2000, took place on March 11, 2001. The ceremony was held at the Shrine Exposition Center in Los Angeles, California, and was televised live by TNT.

The nominees were announced on January 30, 2001, by Lucy Liu and Cary Elwes at Los Angeles' Pacific Design Center.

Winners and nominees
Winners are listed first and highlighted in boldface.

Screen Actors Guild Life Achievement Award 
 Ossie Davis and Ruby Dee

Film

Television

In Memoriam 
Philip Seymour Hoffman introduced this segment remember the members of the guild who died from the last ceremony:

 Walter Matthau
 Loretta Young
 Steve Reeves
 John Colicos
 Meredith MacRae
 Craig Stevens
 Ann Doran
 Dale Evans
 Gail Fisher
 Julie London
 David Dukes
 Douglas Fairbanks, Jr.
 Lila Kedrova
 George Montgomery
 Werner Klemperer
 Steve Allen
 Ray Walston
 Claire Trevor
 Marie Windsor
 John Gielgud
 Nancy Marchand
 Gwen Verdon
 Larry Linville
 Rosemary DeCamp
 Richard Mulligan
 Beah Richards
 Alec Guinness
 Richard Farnsworth
 Billy Barty
 Jason Robards

References

External links
 The 7th Annual Screen Actors Guild Awards

2000
2000 film awards
2000 television awards
Screen
Screen Actors Guild
Screen
March 2001 events in the United States
2000 guild awards

it:Screen Actors Guild Awards 2000